The 2004 Sinai bombings were three bomb attacks targeting tourist hotels in the Sinai Peninsula, Egypt, on 7 October 2004. The attacks left 34 people dead and 171 injured.

The bombings
The explosions occurred on the night of 7 October, against the Hilton Taba and campsites used by Israelis in Ras al-Shitan (see in Hebrew). In the Taba attack, a truck drove into the lobby of the Taba Hilton and exploded, killing 31 people and wounding some 159 others. Ten floors of the hotel collapsed following the blast.

A car parked in front of a restaurant at the Moon Island resort exploded, killing two Israelis and a Bedouin. Twelve were wounded. Another blast happened moments later, targeting the Baddiyah tourist camp, but no one was hurt, apparently because the bomber had been scared off by a guard and did not enter the crowded resort.

Of the 34 who were killed, 18 were Egyptians, 12 were from Israel, two from Italy, one from Russia, and one was an Israeli-American.

The investigation
According to the Egyptian government, the bombers were Palestinians who had tried to enter Israel to carry out attacks there but were unsuccessful. They claimed that the mastermind, Iyad Saleh, recruited Egyptians and Bedouins to find explosives to be used in the attacks. Beginning in March 2004, the bombers used washing machine timers, mobile phones and modified gas cylinders to build the bombs. They used TNT and old explosives found in the Sinai (as it was many times a war zone), which were purchased from Bedouins, to complete the bombs. Egypt has said that Saleh and one of his aides, Suleiman Ahmed Saleh Flayfil, died in the Hilton blast, apparently because their bomb timer had run out too fast.

Three Egyptians, Younes Mohammed Mahmoud, Osama al-Nakhlawi, and Mohammed Jaez Sabbah were sentenced to death in November 2006 for their roles in the blast. Egypt arrested up to 2,400 people following the attacks.

The initial investigations by the Israeli and Egyptian governments centered on al-Qaeda, with Israeli Foreign Minister Silvan Shalom saying "The type, the planning, the scope, the simultaneous attacks in a number of places, all this points to al-Qaeda". However,  Egyptian Presidential Spokesman Majid `Abd al-Fatah later stated that there was no evidence linking the organisation to the attack, instead claiming it was the work of a lone wolf driven by "injustice, aggression and despair" over the Israeli-Palestine conflict.

Aftermath
Israel had warned in September 2004 that terrorists were planning attacks in the Sinai, but most Israelis did not heed those warnings and went on vacation there instead. Many Israelis left the Sinai after the bombings, along with some foreign tourists, but the effects on the country's tourism were not too severe.

Militants struck again in Cairo at tourists in April 2005, killing three and wounding several. Similar attacks took place in resorts in Sharm el-Sheikh in July 2005 and in Dahab in 2006.

See also
 April 2005 Cairo terrorist attacks
 2005 Sharm el-Sheikh attacks
 2006 Dahab bombings
 Ras Burqa massacre

References

External links
 Blasts Hit 3 Egyptian Resorts Popular With Israelis – The New York Times, 8 October 2004
 27 people killed in 3 bombings – The New York Times, 8 October 2004
 Al-Qaeda suspected in attacks at resorts in Egypt – USA Today, 7 October 2004
 Dozens killed in bomb blasts at Sinai resorts – The Guardian, 8 October 2004
 Terror bombings hit Taba and Ras a-Satan in Sinai 7-Oct-2004 – Israeli Ministry of Foreign Affairs

Mass murder in 2004
Terrorist incidents in Egypt in 2004
2004 in Egypt
Explosions in 2004
Suicide bombings in Egypt
Terrorist attacks attributed to Palestinian militant groups
Islamic terrorist incidents in 2004
Suicide car and truck bombings in Egypt
Terrorist incidents in the Sinai Peninsula
Attacks on hotels in Asia
Hotel bombings
October 2004 events in Asia
Massacres in Egypt
South Sinai Governorate